Andrei Varantsou (born 24 July 1975) is a male hammer thrower from Belarus. His personal best throw is 80.56 metres, achieved in June 2006 in Minsk.

Doping 
In 2013 Varantsou failed doping test. He received a life ban.

Achievements

References

1975 births
Living people
Belarusian male hammer throwers
Belarusian sportspeople in doping cases
Doping cases in athletics